The Tindle Group is a British multimedia company operating regional newspapers and radio stations across the British Isles.

It publishes over 200 local newspapers in the UK, a number of which are over 100 years old.

The company is based in Farnham, Surrey, under CEO Danny Cammiade.

It is owned by the Tindle family. Founder Sir Ray Tindle was a "strong believer in 'ultra-local' journalism", a culture which the company still follows today. He remained the company's president until his death in 2022. His son, Owen Tindle, took over as chairman in 2017.

Newspapers 
The Tindle newspaper empire started out in the 1950s, when Sir Ray acquired the Tooting & Balham Gazette with his £300 demob payment after his time serving during the Second World War.

At the company's peak, Tindle Newspapers owned and operated more than 220 local titles.

The following is a partial list of newspapers owned by the company:

Abergavenny Chronicle
Admart
Alton Post Gazette
Biggin Hill News
Bordon Messenger
Bordon Post
Beacon & Radnor Express
Cambrian News
Chew Valley Gazette
Cornish & Devon Post
Cornish Times
County Echo
Crediton Courier
Dawlish Gazette
Edenbridge Chronicle
Faringdon Newspapers
Farnham Herald
The Forester
The Glamorgan Gem
Godalming Messenger
Haslemere Messenger
Isle of Man Newspapers
Leigh Times
Life Magazines
Meon Valley News
Mid Devon Advertiser
Monmouthshire Beacon
North Cornwall Advertiser
Petersfield Messenger
The Ross Gazette
South Hams Gazette
Surrey & Hants News
Tavistock Times
Tenby Observer
Wellington Weekly News
West Somerset Free Press
Woking News and Mail

In 2019, Tindle Newspaper Group closed 4 of their local newspapers.

Radio stations 

In the 1970s, Sir Ray Tindle was an early investor in Capital. In 1998, he sold back his shares in the company to buy Island FM in Guernsey, the first local station to form part of the Tindle group.

The company continued to grow and acquire a dozen stations in England and Wales. Tindle sold its UK radio assets to Anglian Radio in a management buyout in 2013. The stations were then sold on to Celador and later Bauer.

Tindle continues to own and operate Island FM, as well as Channel 103 in Jersey, Midlands 103 in Ireland, and Soleil Radio which broadcasts across the Channel Islands.

Criticism 
In 2003 as the Iraq War started, the owner of the Tindle Newspaper Group, Sir Ray Tindle, issued an order to his newspapers that they could no longer cover anti-war protests. This decision was controversial and was attacked as censorship by a number of commentators, including the National Union of Journalists General Secretary Jeremy Dear.

References

External links
 Official website

Newspaper companies of the United Kingdom
Companies based in Surrey